Messing is a village and former civil parish,  north east of Chelmsford, now in the parish of Messing-cum-Inworth, in the Colchester district, in the county of Essex, England. The village has a population of around 300. In 1931 the parish had a population of 929.

Features 
Messing has a church called All Saints and a pub called The Old Crown.

History 
The name "Messing" means 'Maecca's people'. Messing was recorded in the Domesday Book as Metcinges. On 24 March 1889 part of the parish was transferred to Birch parish, Quashey Corner was transferred from Great Wigborough parish and Kelvedon Road, &c Houses were transferred to Inworth parish. On 1 April 1934 part of the parish was transferred to Layer Marney and part became the new parish of Messing cum Inworth and part became the new parish of Tiptree. On 1 April 1946 the parish was abolished and the remaining 3 acres merged with Birch parish.

References

External links

Villages in Essex
Former civil parishes in Essex
Borough of Colchester